Neonympha is a Nearctic and Neotropical genus of satyrid butterflies.

Species
Listed alphabetically:
Neonympha areolatus (Smith, 1797)
Neonympha helicta (Hübner, [1808])
Neonympha mitchellii French, 1889
"Neonympha" lupita (Reakirt, [1867])

Former species
Neonympha nerita (Capronnier, 1881) is a synonym of Paryphthimoides poltys.

References

 
Nymphalidae of South America
Butterfly genera
Taxa named by Jacob Hübner